Bethel African Methodist Episcopal Church is a historic African Methodist Episcopal church at 202 W. 12th Street in Coffeyville, Kansas, in the original black neighborhood of Coffeyville.  It was built in 1907 and added to the National Register of Historic Places in 1995.

It is a one-story, brick church with elements of Romanesque and Gothic Revival style, on a rusticated limestone foundation.

It was built to replace the congregation's first church, a frame structure from 1882, which the congregation had outgrown.

See also 
 St. John African Methodist Episcopal Church (Topeka, Kansas):  another AME church in Kansas

References

African-American history of Kansas
Methodist churches in Kansas
Churches on the National Register of Historic Places in Kansas
Romanesque Revival church buildings in Kansas
Gothic Revival church buildings in Kansas
Churches completed in 1907
Buildings and structures in Montgomery County, Kansas
National Register of Historic Places in Montgomery County, Kansas
African Methodist Episcopal churches
1907 establishments in Kansas